This article lists the public art of the Corse-du-Sud, in France.

List

See also
 List of public art in Haute-Corse

References

 

Public art